The men's K-1 4 × 500 metres event was a relay kayaking event conducted over 500 meters as part of the Canoeing at the 1960 Summer Olympics program on Lake Albano. This would be the only time this event was held in the Summer Olympics though it was part of the ICF Canoe Sprint World Championships from 1948 to 1975.

Medalists

Results

Heats
The 18 crews first raced in three heats on August 26. The top two finishers in each heats advanced directly to the semifinals. One was disqualified while remaining 11 teams were relegated to the repechage heats.

Czechoslovakia was disqualified in the first heat in accordance to article 22 of the competition rules.

Repechages
Held on August 26, the top two finishers in each of the three repechages advanced to the semifinals.

Semifinals
The top two finishers in each of the three semifinals (raced on August 27) advanced to the final. All other teams were eliminated.

Beudner replaced Knuppe for the Netherlands between the first heat and the first semifinal.

Final
The final was held on August 29.

References

1960 Summer Olympics official report Volume 2, Part 1. pp. 260–5.
International Canoe Federation historical results to 2006 (Olympic and world for all disciplines).
Sports-reference.com 1960 K1 4 × 500 m results.

Men's K-1 4 x 500
Men's events at the 1960 Summer Olympics